Schkölen is a town in the Saale-Holzland district, in Thuringia, Germany. It is situated 12 km south of Naumburg. The village Zschorgula is part of the municipality.

References

Saale-Holzland-Kreis